Paopi 18 - Coptic Calendar - Paopi 20

The nineteenth day of the Coptic month of Paopi, the second month of the Coptic year. On a common year, this day corresponds to October 16, of the Julian Calendar, and October 29, of the Gregorian Calendar. This day falls in the Coptic season of Peret, the season of emergence.

Commemorations

Saints 

 The martyrdom of Saints Theophilus and his Wife, in Fayium

Other commemorations 

 The assembly of a Council in Antioch against Paul of Samosata (262 AD)

References 

Days of the Coptic calendar